Fares Al Janahi (born 24 January 1999) is an Emirati tennis player.

Al Janahi made his ATP main draw debut at the 2020 Dubai Tennis Championships after receiving a wildcard for the doubles main draw.

Al Janahi represents the UAE at the Davis Cup, where he has a W/L record of 5–3.

References

External links

1999 births
Living people
Emirati tennis players